Fatemeh Sohrabi (born 6 September 1990) is an Iranian footballer who plays as a defender for Kowsar Women Football League club Mes Rafsanjan FC and the senior Iran women's national team.

References 

1990 births
Living people
Iranian women's footballers
Iran women's international footballers
Women's association football defenders
People from Kerman
21st-century Iranian women